In chemistry, phase-boundary catalysis (PBC) is a type of heterogeneous catalytic system which facilitates the chemical reaction of a particular chemical component in an immiscible phase to react on a catalytic active site located at a phase boundary. The chemical component is soluble in one phase but insoluble in the other. The catalyst for PBC has been designed in which the external part of the zeolite is hydrophobic, internally it is usually hydrophilic, notwithstanding to polar nature of some reactants. In this sense, the medium environment in this system is close to that of an enzyme. The major difference between this system and enzyme is lattice flexibility. The lattice of zeolite is rigid, whereas the enzyme is flexible.

Design of phase-boundary catalyst

Phase-boundary catalytic (PBC) systems can be contrasted with conventional catalytic systems. PBC is primarily applicable to reactions at the interface of an aqueous phase and organic phase. In these cases, an approach such as PBC is needed due to the immiscibility of aqueous phases with most organic substrate. In PBC, the catalyst acts at the interface between the aqueous and organic phases. The reaction medium of phase boundary catalysis systems for the catalytic reaction of immiscible aqueous and organic phases consists of three phases; an organic liquid phase, containing most of the substrate, an aqueous liquid phase containing most of the substrate in aqueous phase and the solid catalyst.

In case of conventional catalytic system;
When the reaction mixture is vigorously stirred, an apparently homogeneous emulsion is obtained, which segregates very rapidly into two liquid phases when the agitation ceases. Segregation occurs by formation of organic bubbles in the emulsion which move downwards to form the aqueous phase, indicating that emulsion consists of dispersed particles of the aqueous phase in the organic phase.
Due to the triphasic reactions conditions, the overall reaction between aqueous phase and organic phase substrates on solid catalyst requires different transfer processes. The following steps are involved:
 transfer of aqueous phase from organic phase to the external surface of solid catalyst;
 transfer of aqueous phase inside the pore volume of solid catalyst;
 transfer of the substrate from aqueous phase to the interphase between aqueous and organic phases
 transfer of the substrate from the interphase to the aqueous phase;
 mixing and diffusion of the substrate in the aqueous phase;
 transfer of the substrate from the aqueous phase to the external surface of solid catalyst;
 transfer of the substrate inside the pore volume of the solid catalyst;
 catalytic reaction (adsorption, chemical reaction and desorption).
In some systems, without vigorous stirring, no reactivity of the catalyst is observed in conventional catalytic system.[1] [2] [3] [4] [5] Stirring and mass transfer from the organic to the aqueous phase and vice versa are required for conventional catalytic system. Conversely, in PBC, stirring is not required because the mass transfer is not the rate determining step in this catalytic system. It is already demonstrated that this system works for alkene epoxidation without stirring or the addition of a co-solvent to drive liquid–liquid phase transfer.[1] [2] [3] The active site located on the external surface of the zeolite particle were dominantly effective for the observed phase boundary catalytic system.[4]

Process of synthesis
Modified zeolite on which the external surface was partly covered with alkylsilane, called phase-boundary catalyst was prepared in two steps.[1] [2] [3] [4] [5] First, titanium dioxide from titaniumisopropoxide was impregnated into NaY zeolite powder to give sample W-Ti-NaY. In the second step, alkysilane from n-octadecyltrichlorosilane (OTS) was impregnated into the W-Ti-NaY powder containing water. Due to the hydrophilicity of the w-Ti-NaY surface, addition of a small amount of water led to aggregation owing to the capillary force of water between particles. Under these conditions, it is expected that only the outer surface of aggregates, in contact with the organic phase can be modified with OTS, and indeed almost all of the particles were located at the phase boundary when added to an immiscible water–organic solvent (W/O) mixture. The partly modified sample is denoted w/o-Ti-NaY. Fully modified Ti-NaY (o-Ti-NaY), prepared without the addition of water in the above second step, is readily suspended in an organic solvent as expected.

Janus interphase catalyst

Janus interphase catalyst is a new generation of heterogeneous catalysts, which is capable to do organic reactions on the interface of two phases via the formation of Pickering emulsion.

See also
 Phase-transfer catalyst

References

Chemical kinetics
Catalysis